Jonathan "Jonty" Usborne (born 17 July 1990) is a producer and broadcast engineer at BBC News, and writer for The Independent, noted for having won awards such as the Student Radio Award for Best Technical Achievement and the Radio Academy Award for Best Technical Innovation. He is the first university student to have won in a technical category at the Radio Academy Awards. , he is a software engineer for the BBC and the Chair of the Student Radio Association. He also sits on the Trustee Board of the Radio Academy.

Life and career

Born in Brussels, raised in Old Greenwich, Connecticut, and educated at Haileybury & Imperial Service College, Usborne became involved in student radio in 2009, after commencing studying economics at the University of Bath. After being elected in 2011 to the position of Head of Online Media at University Radio Bath—the university's student radio station—he developed FRANCESCA, a station management system and console for the UK's Radioplayer application. Usborne submitted his system for consideration in the Best Technical Innovation category at the 2013 Student Radio Awards, and was awarded gold that November. The judges described his application as "a real innovation".

The following year, Usborne developed Responsive Radio, a "new approach to broadcasting", which incorporated ReQuester, an application he had developed that provided feedback to radio presenters about the musical preferences of their listeners. He submitted Responsive Radio with the United Station Management application for consideration in the 2014 Radio Academy Awards. In May that year, Usborne became the first university student to win in a technical category at the Radio Academy Awards, when he received bronze in the Best Technical Innovation category, beating out competition from both Global Radio and the BBC. The judges described the entry as "a great example of technical innovation creating listener benefit", saying that it was "particularly impressive" that it had been created by "a student station with presumably little resource". Responsive Radio and Unified Station Management were also nominated for the Arqiva TechCon Technical Excellence Award in September 2014. In November, Usborne won gold for Responsive Radio in the Best Technical Achievement category at the 2014 Student Radio Awards.

In April 2014, Usborne was elected to the positions of Station Manager of University Radio Bath and Deputy Events Officer of the Student Radio Association; the following month, he set up and ran the first fully-radio-with-pictures edition of the Student Radio Chart Show. In October, Usborne was named as one of the Radio Academy's "30 Under 30" of the year. In March 2015, he spoke at that year's Radiodays Europe conference in Milan on the future of radio, and in May was elected to the position of Chair of the Student Radio Association. In July he was elected to the Trustee Board of the Radio Academy, and in November was awarded gold for Best Technical Achievement for a third time at the 2015 Student Radio Awards. After graduating from Bath in June 2016, Usborne joined the media playout department at the BBC as a graduate software engineer, and began developing their online web media player.

Awards and accolades

References

External links
Jonty Usborne at the BBC
Jonty Usborne at The Independent

Living people
1990 births
Alumni of the University of Bath
BBC people
British software engineers
English audio engineers
The Independent people
People educated at Haileybury and Imperial Service College
People from Old Greenwich, Connecticut